David or Dave  Callahan, Callaghan, or O'Callaghan may refer to:
 David Callahan, founding editor of Inside Philanthropy, a digital media site
 David Callahan (Home and Away), fictional character in the Australian soap opera
 Dave Callaghan (born 1965), South African cricketer
 Dave O'Callaghan (born 1990), Irish rugby union player
 David O'Callaghan (dual player) (born 1983), Irish hurler and former Gaelic footballer for Dublin
 David O'Callaghan (Kerry Gaelic footballer) (born 1987)